DJ Johnson (born 1957) is an American politician who has been serving in the Kentucky House of Representatives as a Republican for the 13th district representing parts of Daviess County since 2021. He lives in Owensboro, Kentucky. Johnson had previously represented the district from 2017 to 2019. In 2018, he was defeated for re-election by Jim Glenn (whom he had defeated in 2016) by a margin of one vote. In 2020, Johnson successfully defeated Glenn to reclaim his seat in the House.

References

Living people
Republican Party members of the Kentucky House of Representatives
1957 births